Kansas Pacific is a 1953 American Cinecolor Western film released by Allied Artists Pictures and directed by Ray Nazarro. It stars Sterling Hayden and Eve Miller. While the film was released in 1953, the title screen clearly states "Copyright MCMLII" (1952). The film offers a fictionalized account of the struggle to build the Kansas Pacific Railway in the early 1860s just prior to the American Civil War. In the film the building of the railroad in Kansas is opposed by sympathizers of the South before it forms the Confederacy.

General-in-Chief of the United States Army Winfield Scott sends a Corps of Engineers captain (Hayden) incognito to complete the railroad in order to supply western Union outposts when the anticipated war starts. Opposing the railway is Confederate William Quantrill (Reed Hadley), whose mission is to stop or delay the railway from being completed.

The rights to the film are currently in the public domain.

Production
The movie was filmed at the Iverson Movie Ranch and the Sierra Railroad in what is now Railtown 1897 State Historic Park, Jamestown, California. Walter Mirisch of Allied Artists had Walter Wanger's name put on the picture as a producer, although he was in prison for shooting agent Jennings Lang, whom he believed to be having an affair with his wife, Joan Bennett. Thanks to Mirisch, Wanger received a producer's billing, salary and profit participation.

Plot

Set prior to the Civil War but after the South has seceded from the U.S., the film centres on the efforts to build a railroad across Kansas toward the West Coast. Southern sympathizers attempt to sabotage the railroad construction efforts so U.S. Army Corps of Engineers Captain John Nelson, played by Sterling Hayden, is brought in to keep the project going. Captain Nelson must not only contend with the efforts of the saboteurs but also try to romance the railroad foreman's daughter, Barbara Bruce, who is played by Eve Miller. Miller plays the only female character within the entire movie. This film also features Clayton Moore, best known for his role in films and on television as The Lone Ranger. Andrew V. McLaglen is credited as assistant director in the opening credits of this movie.

Cast

Sterling Hayden as Captain John Nelson
Eve Miller as Barbara Bruce
Barton MacLane as Cal Bruce
Reed Hadley as William Quantrill
Irving Bacon as Casey
James Griffith as Joeh Farley
Douglas Fowley as Max Janus
Harry Shannon as Smokestack
Myron Healey as Morey
Clayton Moore as Stone
Robert Keys as Lieutenant Stanton
Tom Fadden as Gus Gustavson
Jonathan Hale as Sherman Johnson
Lane Bradford as Max (uncredited)
Fred Graham as Corvin (uncredited)

Notes

External links
 
 
  (Black-and-white)
  (Color)
 
 

1953 films
American Civil War films
1950s English-language films
Allied Artists films
1953 Western (genre) films
Cinecolor films
Rail transport films
Films directed by Ray Nazarro
Films produced by Walter Wanger
American Western (genre) films
1950s American films